Frank Jarvis may refer to:
 Frank Jarvis (athlete), American Olympic athlete
 Frank Jarvis (actor), British actor